158P/Kowal–LINEAR is a periodic comet in the Solar System that has an orbit out by Jupiter.

The Minor Planet Center had the comet coming to perihelion on 9 May 2021, and JPL had the comet coming to perihelion on 12 May 2021. A close approach to Jupiter on 24 July 2022 will notably lift the orbit and increase the orbital period. The next perihelion passage will be in 2036 at a distance of 5.2 AU from the Sun.

References

External links 
 Orbital simulation from JPL (Java) / Horizons Ephemeris
 158P/Kowal-LINEAR – Seiichi Yoshida @ aerith.net
 158P at Kronk's Cometography

Periodic comets
0158
Discoveries by Charles T. Kowal